Stefán Sölvi Pétursson (born 20 March 1986) is an Icelandic strongman and a finalist of the World's Strongest Man competition, winning 4th place in the 2010 World's Strongest Man competition held in Sun City (South Africa) and 9th place in the 2011 World's Strongest Man competition held in Wingate, North Carolina. He has also won Icelandic Strongman competitions multiple times including Iceland’s Strongest Man in 2009 and 2010.

Career
Stefán was just 20 when he won his first major senior strongman title, becoming Iceland's Strongest Viking in 2006. At 22 years and 178 days, he is also the 7th youngest athlete in history to qualify for the World's Strongest Man competition. Prior to that he had concentrated on powerlifting, but being inspired by Jón Páll Sigmarsson he continued with the sport of strongman. That same year he finished second in the IFSA version of the Iceland's Strongest Man, eventually winning the title in 2008. He was invited to the prestigious Highlander World Championships in 2008, as well as an invitation to Fortissimus in 2008 where he won 8th place out of a stacked field of 13. In 2009 he won third place in the Giants Live Poland and again 3rd place in 2010 in the Giants Live Turkey. He also won 2nd place in 2012 King of the Castle competition in Finland and again 2nd place in 2012 All-American Strongman Challenge.

Later in 2012, tragedy struck as Stefán was diagnosed with Supraventricular tachycardia which took him about 3 years to recover. Returning to Strongman, Stefán unfortunately sustained a major injury during the frame carry event at 2016 Europe's Strongest Man and had to withdraw from competing again until full recovery. 

Stefán was intrigued with the sport of strongman after seeing Jón Páll Sigmarsson, whom he considers as one of his biggest inspirations. Apart from Jón Páll, he has also cited Žydrūnas Savickas as someone he has deep admiration for, and his good friend and long term training partner Hafþór Júlíus Björnsson, believing them to be the strongest strongmen ever.

In 2018, Stefán co-produced and starred in the documentary film 'Fullsterkur' (literally translates as 'full strength' in English) which explores the history and culture of heavy stone lifting in Iceland. Stefán's favourite strongman event is also Natural stone loading.

Personal Records

Strongman
Squat - 330 kg (727 lb)
Bench press - 230 kg (507 lb)
Deadlift - 390 kg (860 lb), 300 kg (661 lb) for 8 reps
 Log press -  (2010 World's Strongest Man - Finals)
 Axel press -  x 3 strict presses (with minimal leg drive)
 Atlas stones - 5 stones  in 18.35 seconds (2010 Giants Live Turkey)
 Atlas stones -  one motion to a 5 ft 4 in platform. 
 Keg toss - 8 kegs  over 5.0 metres in 23.53 seconds (2009 World's Strongest Man - Group 2)
 Keg toss -  over 5.8 metres (19 ft 1 in)
 Farmer's walk/ Frame carry -  (no straps) for 30m in 23.25 seconds (2011 World's Strongest Man - Finals)
 Truck pull -  for 25m in 50.07 seconds (2009 World's Strongest Man - Group 2)

Powerlifting
Squat - 305 kg (672 lb)
Bench press - 225 kg (496 lb)
Deadlift - 370 kg (816 lb)

References

External links
Official Site

Icelandic strength athletes
1986 births
Living people
Place of birth missing (living people)